Philip Lawrence  is a Canadian politician who was elected to represent the riding of Northumberland—Peterborough South in the House of Commons of Canada in the 2019 Canadian federal election. He was appointed Shadow Minister of National Revenue in the Conservative Party's shadow cabinet on Sept. 8,  2020.

Background 
Lawrence started his studies in Political Science at Brock University where he earned his BA. He went on to attend Osgoode Hall Law School and the Schulich School of Business to obtain his law degree and MBA. He started his practice in law with a focus on taxation and corporations. In 2008 he joined one of Canada's largest financial institution becoming the third generation in his family to work in Financial Services. He was 40 years of age in a statement published Sept. 22, 2018.

Lawrence also chose to contribute to his profession by volunteering at the Financial Planning Standards Council. He participated in developing the examination questions, and eventually moved to the disciplinary committee, where he continues to serve.

Politics 
In February 2020, he proposed a private member's bill, Bill C-206, An Act to amend the Greenhouse Gas Pollution Pricing Act (qualifying farming fuel). The bill would have exempted natural gas and propane used by farmers from carbon taxes.

In April 2021, he sponsored an e-petition brought forward by an anti-LGBT pastor aiming to water down Bill-6, which would bring a federal conversion therapy ban into force in Canada.

In mid-May 2021, he sent a letter to the Minister of Public Safety and Emergency Preparedness stating that "the government’s failure to secure the border and prevent the further spread of variants has cost Canadians their lives and livelihoods."

Personal life 
Lawrence is the son of James and Leslie Lawrence. Leslie was a teacher, while James worked in insurance and financial services, bringing Philip on as an associate during his university studies. The family had lived in Regina, Saskatchewan and the Durham area before settling in Pelham Ontario. In 2004 he married Natasha, who is an Occupational Therapist. The couple moved to a farm in Orono, Ontario in January 2013, where they had their two children, James and Margaret. He is a member of the Newcastle Lions Club and a Director in the Northumberland-Peterborough South Conservative Party riding association.

Electoral record

References

External links 

Living people
Conservative Party of Canada MPs
Members of the House of Commons of Canada from Ontario
Year of birth missing (living people)
People from Clarington